The 1999 Women's World Open Squash Championship was the women's edition of the 1999 World Open, which serves as the individual world championship for squash players. The event took place in Seattle in the United States from 16 October until 24 October 1999. Cassie Campion won the World Open title, defeating Michelle Martin in the final.

Seeds

Draw & results

Notes
Cassie Campion was formerly Cassie Jackman.
Sarah Fitzgerald was unable to defend her title due to injury.

See also
World Open
1999 Men's World Open Squash Championship

References

External links
Womens World Open

World Squash Championships
1999 in squash
1999 in American sports
Squash tournaments in the United States
1999 in women's squash
International sports competitions hosted by the United States
1999 in sports in Washington (state)
Sports competitions in Washington (state)
Squash in Washington (state)
Sports in Seattle
Women's sports in Washington (state)